Richard Wade was a member of the Canadian Football League, working for the British Columbia Lions, the Calgary Stampeders, the Ottawa Renegades and the Hamilton Tiger-Cats. Wade entered the league as a guest coach in 2004 and subsequently held various player personnel, scouting and front office roles in the league through 2011.

Wade, an eight-year veteran of the Canadian Football League (CFL), was active in several roles with the British Columbia Lions (2006, 2007, 2011), the Calgary Stampeders (2004), the Ottawa Renegades (2005, 2006) and the Hamilton Tiger-Cats (2008, 2009, 2010). Primarily noted for his work in player personnel, recruiting and evaluation, Wade also held coaching positions with Calgary and Ottawa, where as an offensive assistant coach he worked with quarterbacks and receivers, the offensive line and special teams. In his only front office role, Wade was promoted to Director of Football development in Ottawa 2006 and tasked with re-structuring the club operations.

His development of import players additions was highlighted in his personnel work and in the identification, evaluations, workouts and signings of four import players who were named as CFL Rookies of the Year in 2011, 2007, 2006 and 2004. Wade planned and operated US free agent workout camps that produced numerous active roster impact players and was instrumental in assisting to rebuild the Hamilton Tiger-Cats from 2008 to 2010. In his previous role with the BC Lions, the club has historic levels of success with record seasons of 15–5 and 14–3–1 marks and a 2006 Grey Cup Championship. (Ulrich V.P., Edwards H.S.)

Football background

Coach Richard Wade

Wade would be named as Offensive Line and Special Teams Assistant Coach and responsible for the operation of the club's Player Personnel department working closely with Forrest Gregg, the Renegades executive Vice President.

The press announcement of Wade's hire in Ottawa described Wade as follows:

Forrest Gregg announced Friday that Richard Wade has been named to the new position of Director of Football Development.  Wade, a Los Angeles native will serve in a multi dimensional role as an assistant special teams coach, be involved in Canadian and U.S. player talent evaluations, facilitate player contracts and act as a liaison between the Renegades media department and the Renegade coaching and personnel department. Wade has taken over his new role in the Renegades office 
effective today. (Ottawa Citizen, Ottawa Sun)

Forrest Gregg stated that “Richard is a bright young man who has a wide range of talents that will well serve the Renegade organization.”

Head coach John Jenkins stated “Richard has already served us well as a regional scout in the Western United States, plus I worked with him when he was a guest coach with the Calgary Stampeders, so I know he will be a major asset for our organization."

After the Ottawa Renegades team was suspended Wade was picked up by the British Columbia Lions Football Club,

In the 2006 Grey Cup Championship, after winning the Western Division Final, the BC Lions defeated the Montreal Alouettes 25-14 to cap off a highly successful season, which included CFL Rookie of the Year award Aaron Hunt, Most Outstanding Canadian and defensive Linemen DE Brent Johnson, CFL Top Offensive Linemen and CFL Most Outstanding Player Geroy Simon, Head Coach Wally Buono would later be named CFL Coach of the Year. Returning in 2007 Wade would continue to work with Bob O'Billovich, the BC Lions Director of Player Personnel as a Regional Scout. BC Lions Cameron Wake was named CFL Rookie of the Year marking another stellar scouting season as Wade has now been involved with three scouting programs in four years and has three CFL most outstanding rookies from this time. The BC Lions have eight of the last ten Rookie of the Year award winners.

12 March 2008 Wade joins Bob O'Billovich and the Hamilton Tiger-Cat in the Eastern Division of the Canadian Football League.

CFL players return to the NFL/ Wade Scouting Prospects and Quotes/ Hamilton Spectator Article

The death of both the Arena Football League and NFL Europa means that the CFL and the fledgling United Football League—a four-team league playing a six-game schedule—are the only remaining pro leagues. The success of recent exports such as Cameron Wake (Miami) and Stefan Logan (Pittsburgh) -- both former B.C. Lions—has shown that CFL players can thrive in the NFL.

Ticat general manager Bob O'Billovich says the evolution of the American game is also making CFL players more attractive.

"When you look at the style of play in the U.S now, in both college and the pros, teams are throwing the ball a lot more than they ever did in the past," O'Billovich said, citing the popularity of the spread offence. "Some of the NFL teams are going for the smaller, quicker guys rather than the big, bulky body-type guys. We've been playing with faster guys at most positions for years."

While O'Billovich says he doesn't mind losing players to the NFL -- "you can't fault them for wanting to give it a shot"—there are those around the CFL who have concerns.

"It says good things about our league that there are great players up here and people recognize that," Saskatchewan Roughriders' president-CEO Jim Hopson said this week after losing Chick to the Indianapolis Colts. "I would like to see it be clean -- you have a contract, you finish it and then you go. I'm not sure if that is in the best interest of the CFL at this point."

But Ticat scout Richard Wade, who scouted current Ticat starters DeAndra' Cobb and Marquay McDaniel among others, says there is an upside to the option year.

"For every player we send down south to a healthy NFL contract we get 20 additional prospects who will consider playing in the CFL. From my experience, you see the better agents viewing this route as a legitimate avenue to get a player's career advanced, and thus the league gets a better level of competition in the long run," Wade said in an e-mail.

"And more and more the players see it as a real chance to play now and still live the NFL dream. Replacing players has become better as a result of the flow."

Miami Dolphin "Phins" website/Wade Comment  

Richard Wade scouted, worked out, and signed Chris Wilson and Cam Wake two players who made the jump from the CFL to the NFL successfully, he is sort of a CFL scout/guru who has the eye for talent and he has a great point, it is hard to convince American College Football players to give the CFL a try, but as there is more CFL to NFL cross pollination the CFL can attract those better, more gifted players to give the CFL a shot

The CFL won't make any player wealthy, the #3 overall pick in 2009, Jamall Lee took a shot at the NFL as an UDFA in Carolina last preseason because even if he made the practice squad, his salary would be 5k a week, in the CFL he entire salary would have been 50,000..Canadian Dollars.

2011 Wade vacates Tiger-Cats player personnel role.

The Hamilton Tiger-Cats will forge ahead in 2001 without top US Scout Richard Wade. After a three-season run in Hamilton and a successful rebuild of the O'Billovich era Tiger-Cats Wade has left the club. The team will still heavily rely on Wade's previous prospects with over 19 of Wade's scouting projects still manning the Hamilton roster. These current T-cats include Chris Williams(New Mexico State), Pierre Singfield (Arizona State) and Mitch Mustain (Southern California) joining Markeith knowlton, Marquay McDaniel, Jason Boltus, Demonte Bolden and Justin Hick as other Tiger-Cat player additions. In the O'Billovich/Wade era of 2008, 2009 and 2010 the Tiger-Cats left behind futile season results of 3-15, 4-14 and 1-17 to respectable back to back 9-9 campaigns and two home playoff games.

Canadian Football League 2004-Present

2004 Calgary Stampeders, Quarterbacks and Receivers
2005 Ottawa Renegades,   Western Regional Scout
2006 Ottawa Renegades,   Offensive Line Coach, Player Personnel Director
2006-2007 British Columbia Lions , Western Regional Scout
2008–2011 Hamilton Tiger-Cats,     Western Regional Scout
2011–present British Columbia Lions   Western Regional Scout

References

External links
 Boron, Paul. (Producer). 2008, August 6) Channel 2 news {Television Broadcast}
Denver Colorado: KWGN-TV

 Edwards, Drew. "Scout Wade Unsung Hero." Hamilton Spectator 5 June 2010: Sports Page 3
 Lalji, Farhan. TSN Interview Richard Wade. TSN Web Site 2009 https://www.tsn.ca/cfl/wade.buck pierce
 McNaughton,Scott. "Tiger-Cats Announce New Football Operations Staff", February 2009
 http://www.ticats.ca/article/ticats-announce-football-operations-staff
 Sekeres Matt. "Renegades Add Richard Wade." Ottawa Sun 17 January 2006
 Tsai, Stephen. "Patek has two-year deal with CFL team." - Honolulu Advertiser 8 April 2009
the.honoluluadvertiser.com/article/2009/.../hawaii904080407.htmlCached

 Ulrich, Lowell. "Lions benefit from Wade's Keen Eye for Talent." Vancouver Province 14 June 2011 Sports Page 6
 CFL Web Site Article. "Ti-Cats announce Football Ops Staff." 6 February 2009
 British Columbia Lions Web site. Richard Wade, Regional Scout
 Hamilton Tiger-Cats Team Web Site: Operations; Bio Richard Wade Western Regional Scout
 Ottawa Renegades Media Guide, Football Operations; Bio Richard Wade, Director of Football Development

Year of birth missing (living people)
Living people
Ottawa Renegades coaches
Calgary Stampeders coaches